The 2014 Major League Lacrosse All-Star Game took place on June 13, 2015 at Harvard Stadium, the home of NCAA university Harvard Crimson and MLL club Boston Cannons. The game was televised live on CBS Sports Network in the United States.

The match
Team USA beat Team MLL, 10-9.

References

2014
MLL All-Star Game
MLL All-Star